The Woermann-Linie was a German shipping company that operated from 1885 to 1942.

History
It was founded on 15 June 1885 by Adolph Woermann and developed as one of the leading shipping companies between Europe and  Africa. From 1899 the company was headquartered in Afrikahaus, in Hamburg. 

For decades it transported contract laborers to various places on the African continent, for instance, workers from Liberia and Nigeria to Spanish Guinea. 

The Woermann family sold it to Deutsche Ost-Afrika Linie in 1916.

In 1942,  it and the Deutsche Ost-Afrika Linie were taken over by John T. Essberger. The Deutsche Afrika-Linien lost both fleets in post-war reparations.

See also

External links
 

Defunct shipping companies
Shipping companies of Germany
Companies based in Hamburg
Transport companies established in 1890
Transport companies disestablished in 1942
1942 disestablishments in Germany
1890 establishments in Africa
1942 disestablishments in Africa
Defunct transport companies of Germany
German companies established in 1885